Hackpad was a web-based collaborative real-time text editor forked from Etherpad.

It was used as the company wikis by multiple prominent startups of the 2010s, such as Airbnb, Stripe, and Upworthy.

In April 2014, Hackpad was acquired by Dropbox. In April 2015, it was announced that Hackpad would be released as open source and source code was published on GitHub in August 2015, under the Apache license 2.0. On April 25, 2017, Hackpad announced that it is to shut down on July 19, 2017, permanently migrating to Dropbox Paper.

See also 
 Etherpad
 Google Docs

References

External links 
 

Collaborative real-time editors
Free note-taking software